Arge pectoralis, the birch sawfly, is a species of argid sawfly in the family Argidae. This sawfly is present in North America.

References

External links

 

Argidae
Articles created by Qbugbot